Only When I Dance is a 2009 documentary film directed by Beadie Finzi.

Synopsis
Only When I Dance tells the story of two teenagers, Irlan and Isabela, who pursue their dreams of becoming professional ballet dancers as a way to escape the violent slums of Rio de Janeiro.

Release
The film premiered at the Tribeca Film Festival in April 2009. It was subsequently shown at several other major film festivals, including the Edinburgh International Film Festival, the San Francisco International DocFest, the Rio Film Festival, Guadalajara Film Festival and Sheffield Doc/Fest. It was broadcast on television in the United Kingdom on Christmas Day 2009. It was released in USA in summer 2010. Prior to release it was pitched at the 2007 Sheffield Doc/Fest MeetMarket.

Production
The producers spent over three years trying to find the candidates to be filmed, and the film took around ten months to film.

Reception
The film received mostly positive reviews from critics, with The Guardian awarding it four out of five stars and calling it a "moving, if rather shallow documentary". The website Eye for Film awarded the film three and a half out of five stars, saying the film "shows how an artistic calling can be imbued with life-and-death determination."

References

External links

2009 films
Documentary films about ballet
Films set in Rio de Janeiro (city)
British documentary films
2000s Portuguese-language films
2009 documentary films
2000s English-language films
2000s British films